The secretary of state of Vermont is one of five cabinet-level constitutional officers in the U.S. state of Vermont which are elected every two years. The secretary of state is fourth (behind the lieutenant governor, speaker of the House of Representatives, president pro tempore of the Senate, respectively) in the line of succession to the office of Governor of Vermont.  The Office of the Secretary of State is located at 128 State St. in Montpelier. Since 2023, the secretary of state has been Sarah Copeland-Hanzas, a Democrat.

Responsibilities 
The agency, headed by the Vermont secretary of state, manages several divisions and departments including:

 The State Archives Division is charged with preserving and keeping accessible all state records. The State Archives preserve documents going back to the state's founding as the Vermont Republic in 1777.
 The Office of Professional Regulations licenses and regulates 39 professional occupations to protect the state's citizens from incompetent, unethical, and unprofessional behavior.
 The Elections Divisions administers Vermont's elections, works to protect the integrity of the democratic process, registers voters, coordinates administration of the Voter's Oath, oversees campaign finance reporting, and implements Vermont's lobbyist disclosure laws.
 The Corporations Division registers business entities and is the filing repository for Uniform Commercial Code filings for the state of Vermont.
 The Notary Resource Center oversees Vermont's notaries public.

The Secretary of State's Office is also responsible for the filing and publication of administrative rules by all state agencies.

The office of Secretary of State pre-dates Vermont statehood in 1791.  Prior to 1884 the Secretary of State was chosen in a vote of the Vermont General Assembly.  The first secretary of state chosen by the voters of the state was Charles W. Porter.

List of Vermont secretaries of state
Vermont's secretaries of state since 1778 include:

See also
 List of company registers

References

External links 
Government of Vermont portal

1778 establishments in Vermont